Swarup Rani Nehru (née Thussu, 1868 – 10 January 1938) was an Indian independence activist. She was the wife of the barrister and Indian National Congress leader Motilal Nehru and mother of India's first prime minister, Jawaharlal Nehru. 

She played a prominent role in India's freedom movement in the 1920s–30s as an advocate of civil disobedience against the British Raj and its salt laws, and encouraged women to make salt. 
 

Born into a Kashmiri Pandit family, Swarup Rani came from Lahore, British India, and married Motilal Nehru after his first wife and child died in childbirth. They had three children; Jawaharlal Nehru, Vijayalakshmi and Krishna. During the First World War, Swarup Rani helped knit and gather woollen clothing for soldiers, along with groups of European and Indian ladies.
 

Until 1920, Swarup Rani resided in relative luxury. She lived with an extended family in a large house then known as Anand Bhavan, in Allahabad, Uttar Pradesh. In 1920, with Gandhi as the leader of Indian National Congress and with his twofold strategy of non-cooperation with the British and a fight against Indian "social evils" starting with untouchability, the ethos and functioning of the her household transformed. Both her husband and son gave up their legal practices and she joined the Nehru women in stricter self-discipline and the civil disobedience movement. In the 1930s, she became active in advocating for women to make salt in breach of British salt laws and experienced being beaten and injured in a lathi charge during a demonstration.

Swarup Rani died in 1938. The Swarup Rani Nehru Hospital in Allahabad is named in her honour.

She was the mother of Vijaya Lakshmi Pandit, who became the first woman president of the United Nations General Assembly, grandmother of India's only woman prime minister Indira Gandhi, and great grandmother of Rajiv Gandhi and Sanjay Gandhi. Rahul Gandhi and Priyanka Gandhi Vadra are her great great grandchildren.

Early life

Swarup Rani Nehru was born in 1868 and came from Lahore, British India. Her family were of Kashmiri Brahmin origin. Her eyes were hazel in colour and her hair was chestnut brown. She herself understood English, but did not speak it.
 
She was the second wife of Motilal Nehru, who had previously married as a teenager, Both his first wife and their son died in childbirth. Soon after Swarup Rani and Motilal married, they had a son who died in infancy. One legend recounts that they were informed by a yogi that they would never have a son, and ten months after the yogi's death, on 14 November 1889, a boy, Jawaharlal Nehru was born. A few years into their marriage however, Swarup Rani's health deteriorated. For the rest of her life, during recurrent relapses of illness, her elder sister Rajvati took care of her.

Family life before 1920 took place in the mansion then known as Anand Bhavan, Allahabad, in an affluent neighbourhood with mainly British neighbours. The household consisted of an extended family. There was electricity and running water, and the compound included stables, a swimming pool and a tennis court. Many of Swarup Rani's husband's suits were tailored in Saville Row, her son's toys came from England, and the family was the first in Allahabad to own a car. 
 
On 18 August 1900, Swarup Rani gave birth to a daughter, Sarup Kumari, better known as Vijayalakshmi Pandit.
 
On 5 May 1905, Swarup Rani left Bombay and travelled to London with her husband, son and eldest daughter. Motilal's intentions were to place Jawaharlal in a good school, and also, as he noted to his nephew Brij Lal Nehru, who was in Oxford at the time, to "consult some specialists about the proper treatment and the most suitable watering place for [my] wife". Following a tour of Europe, and a farewell to Jawaharlal at Harrow School, they arrived back in Allahabad in November 1905. In the same month, and coincidentally on Jawaharlal's birthday, Swarup Rani gave birth to a third son, who they named Ratan Lal. However, this son died in infancy. On 2 November 1907, Swarup Rani's second daughter and last child, Krishna, was born.

Swarup Rani's daughters' names were anglicized from 'Nanhi' and 'Beti', to 'Nan' and 'Betty' by their English governesses, and Jawaharlal was tutored in English poetry. Swarup Rani however, was a key influence on him. An early family portrait has Victorian-looking style, and Jawaharlal sits in a sailor suit, however, Swarup Rani and the other Nehru women in the household exerted a traditional Hindu influence on him. Despite becoming increasingly unwell herself, Swarup Rani went to much effort to keep at bay 'the evil eye' from those who were envious or who excessively admired her only surviving son, by applying a black dot on his forehead. 
 
During the First World War, Swarup Rani helped knit and gather woollen clothing for soldiers, along with groups of European and Indian ladies. Sometime before 1916, Swarup Rani received a letter from her son Jawaharlal, suggesting that he preferred not to have an arranged marriage, and might choose to stay a bachelor. However, Swarup Rani had consulted a trusted pandit, and after having their horoscopes compared, Jawaharlal Nehru and Kamala Kaul were married on 8 February 1916.
 
A swami once recounted that Swarup Rani was "a devout, traditional Hindu whose one regret was that Jawaharlal and Kamala had no living son". On the night of 19 November 1917, Swarup announced "Hua". Unable to say "female", she simply announced that it has happened: a grandchild (later known as Indira Gandhi) had been born while her husband was drinking Haig. She had wanted a grandson. Later, Indira would refer to her grandmother as "Dol Amma", the grandmother who would give her sweets from the "doli", the food cupboard.

Later life

In 1920, with Gandhi as the leader of the Indian National Congress and with his two-fold strategy of non-cooperation with the British and a fight against Indian "social evils" starting with untouchability, the ethos and functioning of the Nehru family household transformed. Both Jawaharlal and Motilal gave up their legal practices. The resulting financial difficulties also led to the sale of the Nehru women's jewellery, including Swarup Rani's. Their daughter Krishna was taken out from school, the twice daily meals merged into one, and stables, staff, the fineries of life including crockery and crystal were reduced. The women subsequently adapted to a house frequently visited by Congress men.
 
On 7 December 1921, shortly after the Viceroy gave instructions to the Secretary of State to arrest and prosecute "any person, however prominent" ... considered necessary "for maintenance of law and respect of authority", Motilal and Jawaharlal were arrested and taken to prison. At an interview with Swarup Rani, she "rejoiced in the great privilege of sending my dear husband and my only son to jail" and she added that "Mahatma Gandhi told me once that others in the world have also their only sons". On 26 January 1922, with the aim to recruit women to the Indian Congress party, Swarup Rani presided over a meeting in Idgah where 1000 people attended. Swarup Rani's granddaughter Nayantara Sahgal, later described how Swarup Rani "had in her widowhood taken a soldier's part in the national movement".

In 1930, with the launch of the civil disobedience movement and Gandhi's salt march, Motilal gave Anand Bhavan to the Indian Congress Party. In the same year, Swarup Rani, in favour of the movement against the British Raj and its salt laws, endorsed the self manufacturing of salt. She appealed to women to enlist themselves into co-operating for self-rule: "if you are true to your motherland then you should start manufacturing salt in every household". When Motilal died on 6 February 1931, Swarup Rani was at his bedside.
 
In 1932, on a visit to Calcutta for Kamala's treatment, Swarup Rani expressed concern over Kamala's strict adherence to self-discipline and refraining from all forms of luxuries, wishing for her to wear at least a "necklace and a pair of bangles". During another incident, a day after visiting her son in prison, Swarup Rani was found by a swami to be sitting in a room in the sweltering heat and without the fan switched on. The swami reported "the mother's heart was touched, and henceforth she refused to enjoy the comfort of an electric fan while her son rotted in the hot prison cell". In the same year, she was beaten and injured in a lathi charge during a demonstration. She wrote to her son "the mother of a brave son is also somewhat like him".
 
In his autobiography, Jawaharlal Nehru writes: "Though my admiration and affection for him (his father) remained as strong as ever, fear formed part of them. Not so with my mother. I had no fear of her, for I knew that she would condone everything I did, and because of her excessive and indiscriminating love for me, I tried to dominate over her a little. I saw much more of her than I did of father."

Death and legacy
She died on 10 January 1938, with her sister, son Nehru and daughters Sarup and Betty beside her. Her sister died the following day.
 
As well as the wife of Indian National Congress leader Motilal Nehru and mother of India's first prime minister Pandit Nehru, Swarup Rani was the mother of Vijayalakshmi Pandit who became the first woman president of the United Nations General Assembly, grandmother of India's only ever woman prime minister Indira Gandhi and great grandmother of Rajiv Gandhi and Sanjay Gandhi. Rahul Gandhi, Priyanka Gandhi Vadra and Varun Gandhi are her great great grandchildren.

The Swarup Rani Nehru Hospital in Allahabad is named in her honour.

See also
Nehru–Gandhi family

References

Cited sources 

Nanda, B. R. The Nehrus Motilal and Jawaharlal. The John Day Company (1962). New York
Kalhan, Promilla. Kamala Nehru; An Intimate Biography. Publishing House Pvt Ltd (1973). Delhi
Tharoor, Shashi. Nehru: The Invention of India. Arcade Publishing (2003). New York. First edition. 
Jawharlal Nehru and Nayantara Sahgal. Before freedom, 1909–1947 : Nehru's letters to his sister. Roli Books (2004).

Further reading
Jawaharlal Nehru An Autobiography. Oxford University Press (1936)

Nehru–Gandhi family
Jawaharlal Nehru
Indian independence activists from Uttar Pradesh
Indian women activists
1868 births
1938 deaths